Ptychocroca simplex is a species of moth of the family Tortricidae. It is found in Valparaíso Region, Chile.

Etymology
The species name refers to the somewhat simple valva of the male genitalia.

References

Moths described in 2003
Euliini
Moths of South America
Taxa named by Józef Razowski
Endemic fauna of Chile